Southern Queensland Institute of TAFE (SQIT) is an Australian vocational college for teaching Tertiary and Further Education. The Institute provides training across a significant portion of Southern Queensland with campuses in  Toowoomba, Roma, Warwick, Kingaroy, Dalby, Chinchilla, Charleville, Cherbourg and Stanthorpe.

The Cherbourg campus is known by the name 'Nurunderi' which means 'Taught by Great Spirit' and is notable for being the only TAFE campus in Queensland to be built on designated Aboriginal land.

SQIT offers more than 300 courses covering a number of different study areas, and course qualifications vary from Certificate I level, through to Advanced Diploma. The student demographic varies, and includes high school students, to school leavers, international students, through to those seeking a career change. SQIT also works closely with industry to provide tailored training, qualifications, and skillsets to employees.

SQIT students are able to choose from courses covering:
 Arts, entertainment and media
 Building and construction
 Commerce and IT
 Engineering and automotive
 General education and training
 Hairdressing, beauty and massage
 Health and community services
 Horticulture and primary industries
 Hospitality, tourism and events, and
 Mining, resources and infrastructure.

SQIT courses can be taught on-campus or externally and if eligible, students can use Recognition of Prior Learning to gain qualifications. SQIT students can also gain credit towards university degrees, and some SQIT courses offer pathways to university.

Awards:
 2012 State Finalist – ‘Large Training Provider of the Year’ – Queensland Training Awards
 2012 Darling Downs South West Regional Winner – Hauenschild Apprentice of the Year – Queensland Training Awards
 2012 Darling Downs South West Regional Winner – Bob Marshman Trainee of the Year – Queensland Training Awards
 2012 Darling Downs South West Regional Winner – Aboriginal and Torres Strait Island Student of the Year – Queensland  Training Awards
 2012 Staff Excellence Award from the Department of Education, Training and Employment
 2011 MINTRAC - National Meat Industry Training Initiative Award - Kangaroo Harvester Refresher Training program 
 2011 Health and Community Services Workforce Innovation Awards - Excellence in Cultural Inclusiveness in the Workforce SQIT's Indigenous Primary Health Care team 
 2011 Health and Community Services Workforce Innovation Awards - Excellence in Recruitment Aged Care Skills Formation Strategy Toowoomba

References 

TAFE Queensland
Darling Downs